The High Sheriff of Kildare was the British Crown's judicial representative in County Kildare, Ireland from the 16th century until 1922, when the office was abolished in the new Free State and replaced by the office of Kildare County Sheriff. The High Sheriff had judicial, electoral, ceremonial and administrative functions and executed High Court Writs. In 1908, an Order in Council made the Lord Lieutenant the Sovereign's prime representative in a county and reduced the High Sheriff's precedence. However, the sheriff retained his responsibilities for the preservation of law and order in the county. The usual procedure for appointing the sheriff from 1660 onwards was that three persons were nominated at the beginning of each year from the county and the Lord Lieutenant then appointed his choice as High Sheriff for the remainder of the year. Often the other nominees were appointed as under-sheriffs. Sometimes a sheriff did not serve his full term due to death or another event, and another sheriff was then appointed for the remainder of the year. The dates given in this article are the dates of appointment.

In Ireland, the County Sheriffs were selected or "pricked" by the Lord Lieutenant. All addresses are in County Kildare unless stated otherwise.

List of High Sheriffs of County Kildare

Pre-17th century
Source: Kildare Archeological Society
1299 : William Alysaundre
1301: Albert de Kenley
1303 Sir Waleran de Wellesley (or John de Wellesley), knight, killed in battle with the Irish, October 1303, aged 70. Son of Waleran de Wellesley (died c.1276), justice in eyre, ancestor of the Duke of Wellington;
1306: Sir Hugh Canoun, or Canon.
1310–1314: David le Maryner (or Mazener)  
1355: Richard  Penkiston (also Escheator for Kildare)
1368: William De Wellesley (first  term)
1372: William de Wellesley (second term)
1374: Walter fitz John le Faunt
1375: John Creef
1376: Adam de Lyt
1378: Robert FitzEustace (? of Cradockstown). 
1384 William   De Wellesley 
1386: Sir Maurice FitzEustace 
1391: William de Wellesley 
1392: John Fitz Maurice 
1394: Patrick Flatesbury
1403: William de Wellesley 
1414: Sir Richard FitzEustace
1415–16: Sir Richard De Wellesley of Dangan, County Meath and of Pollardstown, County Kildare
1419: Sir  Richard De  Wellesley (second term)
1421: Sir Richard De Wellesley of Dangan, County Meath and of Pollardstown, County Kildare (third term)
1422: Sir Richard De Wellesley (fourth term)
1423: Sir Edward FitzEustace, Knt.
1428: Sir Edward FitzEustace, Knt.
1446: Robert Flatesbury (killed 1448)
1452: Christopher De Wellesley of Alasty
1456: Robert FitzEustace of Ballycutland (Coghlanstown)
1465: Christopher Flatesbury of Osbertown
1472: Philip Eustace of Newland
1484: Lawrence Sutton of Barbystown
1493: Richard Eustace of Eilgon (?Eilgowan)
1494: Bartholomew Aylmer of Lyons
1495: Bartholomew Aylmer
1496: Sir William De Wellesley
1498: Laurence Sutton of Tipper
1499: Maurice Eustace of Ballyoutland (Coghlanstown)
1502: Sir William Wogan of Rathcoffey
1507: William Eustace of Newland
1508: Laurence Sutton of Tipper
1509: William Eustace of Cradockstown
1523: Thomas Eustace, 1st Viscount Baltinglass of Henryston (Harristown)
1527: Thomas Netterfeld, snr.
1535: John Eustace of Harriston
1536: James FitzGerald of Osberdiston (Osberstown).
1537–38: Philip fitzMaurice FitzGerald, of Allen.
1540: William Birmingham of Dunfert.
1541: James FitzGerald of Ballysonnane (Ballyshannon).
1542: Nicholas Wogan of Rathcoffey
1543: Richard Aylmer of Lyons
1544: William Eustace of Mone (? Moone)
1556: Nicholas Eustace of Cradockston
1557: Patrick Sarsfield of Castledillon
1558: Redmund Fitzgeralde of Rathangan
1558–1560: Francis Cosby of Even [now Monasterevin]
1560: Maurice FitzGerald of "Gerardston"
1567: John Eustace of Castlemartin
1571: Robert Pypho
1573: Piers Fitz-Gerald of Ballysonan
1576: John Eustace of Castle Marten
1578: Peter Fitz-Gerald of Ballysonan
1580: John Eustace of Castle Marten
1581: Piers Fitz-Gerald of Ballysonan
1583: Redmond Bermingham of the Grange
158n: Thomas Fitz-Gerald of Timahoe, Co. Kildare
158n: William Eustace
1592: Maurice Eustace
1593: Sir Richard Fitzgerald
1594: John Sarsfield
1595: Sarsfield
1596: John Fitz-Gerald
1597: Sir Henry Duke
1598: James Fitz-Gerald

17th century

18th century

19th century

20th century
1900: George Wolfe of Forenaghts and Bishopsland
1901: William Trench Kirkpatrick of Donacomper, Celbridge
1902: Sir Kildare Dixon Borrowes, 10th Baronet of Barretstown Castle, Ballymore Eustace, Naas
1903: James Laurence Carew
1903: Bertram Francis Barton of Straffan House
1904:
1906: Nicholas Joseph Synnott.
1906: Henry Eliardo de Courcy-Wheeler of Robertstown House.
1907: Sir William Goulding, 1st Baronet of Millicent, Sallins.
1908: Bertram Hugh Barton of Straffan House.
1909: Hugh Arthur Henry of Firmount, Sallins.
1910: Joseph Henry Greer of Grange, Moy, Co. Tyrone.
1911: Hugh Wyndham Montgomery of Ballymore.
1912:
1916: Capt Rt Hon Herbert Dixon, OBE, Ballyalloy, Nr Comber, Co Down.

References

 
Kildare
History of County Kildare